Anton Vladimirovich Dolin is a Russian film critic, journalist, radio host, blogger and podcaster. He was the chief editor of the Iskusstvo Kino magazine from 2017 to 2022 and the regular film reviewer of Evening Urgant from 2012 to 2020.

Biography 
Anton Dolin is a son of a Soviet poet Veronika Dolina and professor of physics Vladimir Vorobyov. He graduated from Moscow State University (Faculty of Philology) in 1997 as a teacher of Russian literature. In 2000, he graduated from the doctoral program of Gorky Institute of World Literature, writing a dissertation for the degree of Candidate of Philological Sciences on "The history of the Soviet fairy-tale novel," which he did not end up defending.

He worked as a host for the Echo of Moscow from 1997 to 2003 and for Radio Mayak from 2007 to 2019. He has also worked for such newspapers and magazines as Moskovskiye Novosti (2006–2007), Expert (2006–2013), The New Times (2008–2017), Vedomosti (2011–2014), Gazeta.Ru (2012–2013), Afisha (2013–2017), and Meduza (since 2017). He was the regular film reviewer of the Vesti FM from 2010 to 2019, and then of the Silver Rain Radio. In 2012 Dolin joined the staff of the Evening Urgant late-night show as a host of the film review section. In 2020, he was fired from Channel One for publishing a negative review on Andrei Kravchuk's Union of Salvation for Meduza.

In 2017 Anton Dolin became the editor-in-chief of the Iskusstvo Kino film magazine. In 2021 he started his own YouTube channel Radio Dolin, supported by Meduza. He is the co-host of Galina Yuzefovich's podcast Book bazaar (Knizhny bazar) since 2021.

Public activity 

Dolin claims to be 'a follower of democracy and liberalism'. He supports Russian opposition leader Alexei Navalny despite the fact that there was a collision between them over the dual citizenship of Kremlin-linked journalist Sergey Brilyov.

In 2013, Dolin opposed the Russian gay propaganda law and expressed support to the Russian LGBT community. In 2014, he supported Euromaidan and criticized the Russian government for interfering in the internal affairs of Ukraine. In September 2020, Dolin supported the Belarusian protests. On 7 March 2022, after protesting the Russian invasion of Ukraine, Dolin fled to Riga in Latvia following death threats by Russian ultranationalists.

In 2020, he supported Lubov Arcus during a public scandal in social media that led to her resignation from Seans magazine.

He is a member of the public council of the Russian Jewish Congress.

Artistic preferences 
Dolin chose following movies for the Sight & Sound's 2012 survey on the greatest films in history:
 Eraserhead by David Lynch
 The Idiots by Lars von Trier
 Indiana Jones and the Temple of Doom by Steven Spielberg
 Mirror by Andrei Tarkovsky
 My Friend Ivan Lapshin by Aleksei German
 The Word by Carl Theodor Dreyer
 The Phantom of Liberty by Luis Buñuel
 Psycho by Alfred Hitchcock
 The Seventh Seal by Ingmar Bergman
 The Nibelungs by Fritz Lang

Anton Dolin calls Manoel de Oliveira his favourite film director and Richard Wagner, Wolfgang Amadeus Mozart, and Luigi Nono his favourite composers. In 2020 he has also mentioned The Beatles as his favourite music band.

References 

1976 births
Living people
Journalists from Moscow
Moscow State University alumni
Echo of Moscow radio presenters
Russian people of Jewish descent
Russian atheists
Russian bloggers
Russian editors
Russian film critics
Russian liberals
Russian magazine editors
Russian male journalists
Russian podcasters
Russian radio personalities
Russian YouTubers
Russian activists against the 2022 Russian invasion of Ukraine
Meduza
People listed in Russia as media foreign agents